Two-Micron Sky Survey, or IRC, or Caltech infrared catalog is the astronomical catalogue of the infrared sources published in the 1969 by Neugebauer and Leighton.

Catalogue index consists of two numbers - declination rounded to multiplier of 10 degrees, with sign, and star ordinal number within declination band. Catalog contains about 5000 objects between declinations +15 and -15 degrees. Most of the sources are M-type stars. A supplement was also published with further data on 831 sources.

References

External links
Online catalogue at VizieR

Astronomical catalogues